Tom Domako (born July 31, 1966) is a retired American basketball player.  He played professionally in the top leagues in France and Belgium, but is best known for his college career at Montana State University.

College career
Domako was born in Detroit, Michigan, but lived in the Detroit suburb of Livonia.  A 6'9" forward known for his shooting touch, Domako starred at Stevenson High School before choosing Montana State for college.  At MSU, Domako was a sophomore starter on the 1985–86 Bobcats team that won the Big Sky Conference tournament and made the school's first NCAA tournament appearance in 35 years.  As a junior, Domako led the Big Sky Conference in scoring (20.3 points per game) and was named the Big Sky Conference Player of the Year and first-team All-Big Sky.  In his senior year of 1987–88, he increased his scoring average to 22.2 points per game and repeated on the all-conference first team.

Domako ended his career with 1,841 points and left as the school's third leading all-time scorer, and his 667 points in his senior season were the most in school history.  In 2003, he was named to the Montana State Athletic Hall of Fame.

Professional career
Following his senior season, Domako was not selected in the 1988 NBA draft.  He instead signed with Villeurbanne in the French League, where he averaged 21.4 points per game in his first professional season.  The next few seasons, Domako played in the Continental Basketball Association (CBA) and in Belgium before moving into private business.  He spent two seasons in the CBA between the Cedar Rapids Silver Bullets, the Columbus Horizon and the Rochester Renegade.  He averaged 10.4 points and 3.5 rebounds per game in 68 games over the 1989–90 and 1991–92 seasons.

References

External links
French League profile

1966 births
Living people
American expatriate basketball people in Belgium
American expatriate basketball people in France
American men's basketball players
ASVEL Basket players
Basketball players from Detroit
Cedar Rapids Silver Bullets players
Columbus Horizon players
Montana State Bobcats men's basketball players
Rochester Renegade players
Small forwards
Sportspeople from Livonia, Michigan